Graham Jonathan Zusi (born August 18, 1986) is an American professional soccer player who plays as a midfielder or defender for Major League Soccer club Sporting Kansas City. From 2012 to 2017, Zusi represented the United States national team, earning 55 caps and scoring 5 goals. Zusi is the longest-tenured player to have played with one club in MLS history.

Early life and college
Born in Longwood, Florida, Zusi, alongside his siblings, was first coached by his father, David. He played high school soccer at Lake Brantley High School.

Zusi played college soccer for the Maryland Terrapins of the University of Maryland, College Park. During his college career with the Terrapins, Zusi played in 89 games, recording 28 goals and 20 assists, and helped Maryland win the National Championship in 2005 and 2008, scoring the game-winning goal in the 2008 National Semi-Final and Championship Games. He graduated with a degree in criminology.

Club career
During his college years Zusi also played with Central Florida Kraze in the USL Premier Development League.

Sporting Kansas City
Zusi was drafted in the second round (23rd overall) of the 2009 MLS SuperDraft by the Kansas City Wizards. He made his professional debut on March 21, 2009, in Kansas City's first game of the 2009 MLS season against Toronto FC.

Zusi enjoyed a breakout season in 2011 helping the renamed Sporting Kansas City franchise to an Eastern Conference championship and earning a call-up to the U.S. national team. His efforts were rewarded by Sporting with a new four-year contract announced on February 16, 2012. In the 2012 season he led the league in assists with 15.

During the 2012–13 offseason, Zusi trialed with English Premier League side West Ham United.

Zusi returned to Sporting Kansas City and became a converted right-back, earning MLS All Star selections in 2016, 2017, and 2018, while helping guide Sporting Kansas City to the 2017 U.S. Open Cup Title.

Zusi re-signed with the club for the 2022 season.

International career

On January 21, 2012, Zusi made his debut for the United States in a 1–0 win over Venezuela in a friendly match. He scored his first international goal on January 25, 2012, in the ninth minute against Panama in a 1–0 victory. Zusi was named to the national team's Hexagonal roster for the February 6, 2013 match against Honduras; he entered the game as a second-half substitute.

On October 15, 2013, Zusi scored a stoppage-time equalizer against Panama in a World Cup qualifier. Though the United States had already qualified, Zusi's goal meant that Mexico would advance to the next round at Panama's expense. As a result, a group of Mexico fans later presented Zusi with a framed photo and plaque with the words San Zusi ("Saint Zusi").

On June 16, 2014, in the United States' first game in the 2014 FIFA World Cup, Zusi provided the assist from a corner kick for John Brooks' game-winning goal in the 2–1 victory against Ghana. On June 22, 2014, in the United States' second game in the World Cup, Zusi provided the assist for Clint Dempsey's goal in the 2–2 draw against Portugal.

On March 29, 2016, going two years without scoring for the United States, Zusi scored the fourth goal against Guatemala in their campaign to qualify for the 2018 World Cup in Russia. Later that year, Zusi scored a late goal for the United States to put them up 4–0 against Costa Rica during the Copa América Centenario. His goal ensured that the 4–0 win over Costa Rica was the largest against Costa Rica in history for the national team.

Following the failure to qualify for the 2018 FIFA World Cup and Bruce Arena’s departure, Zusi was not called into the team by Dave Sarachan and Gregg Berhalter.

Career statistics

Club

International

Scores and results list United States' goal tally first, score column indicates score after each Zusi goal.

Honors
Maryland Terrapins
NCAA Men's Division I Soccer Championship: 2005, 2008

Sporting Kansas City
MLS Cup: 2013
U.S. Open Cup: 2012, 2015, 2017
Eastern Conference (regular season): 2011, 2012
Eastern Conference (playoffs): 2013
Western Conference (regular season): 2018, 2020

United States
CONCACAF Gold Cup: 2017

Individual
MLS Breakout Player of the Year: 2011
MLS Best XI: 2012, 2013
MLS All-Star (7): 2012, 2013, 2014, 2015, 2017, 2018, 2019
Sporting Kansas City Most Valuable Player: 2012, 2013
CONCACAF Gold Cup Best XI: 2017

See also
List of one-club men in association football

References

External links
 
 

1986 births
Living people
American soccer players
Maryland Terrapins men's soccer players
Orlando City U-23 players
Sporting Kansas City players
USL League Two players
Major League Soccer players
Major League Soccer All-Stars
Designated Players (MLS)
Sporting Kansas City draft picks
NCAA Division I Men's Soccer Tournament Most Outstanding Player winners
Soccer players from Florida
United States men's international soccer players
2014 FIFA World Cup players
2015 CONCACAF Gold Cup players
Copa América Centenario players
2017 CONCACAF Gold Cup players
Association football midfielders
Sportspeople from Seminole County, Florida
People from Longwood, Florida
CONCACAF Gold Cup-winning players
Lake Brantley High School alumni